Beke is a surname. Notable people with the surname include:

Anton Beke (born 1966), British ballroom dancer
Charles Tilstone Beke (1800–1874), English explorer
Emanuel Beke (1862–1946), Beke Manó, Hungarian mathematician
John Beke, 1st Baron Beke (d.1303/4), a baron
Péter Beke (born 1994),  Hungarian football player
Richard Beke (1630–1707), English politician
Rutger Beke (born 1977), Belgian triathlete
Walter Beke (fl.12th century), Anglo-Flemish landholder
Wouter Beke (born 1974), Belgian politician
Zoltán Beke (born 1911), Romanian footballer